The 2017–18 season is the 90th season in Real Valladolid ’s history.

Squad
.

Transfers
List of Spanish football transfers summer 2017#Valladolid

In

Out

Competitions

Overall

Liga

League table

Matches

Kickoff times are in CET.

Copa del Rey

References

Real Valladolid seasons
Real Valladolid